The Hot 100 Airplay chart ranks the most frequently broadcast songs on US radio stations, published by Billboard magazine. Prior to December 1990, radio stations were simply asked what songs were on their playlists and what songs have recently been added. Nielsen BDS was introduced in Billboard in January 1990 and first used on the Billboard Country music chart. Billboard introduced the Top 40 Radio Monitor on December 8, 1990, as a BDS-monitored airplay chart for comparison to the Hot 100 airplay-component chart, which was determined by radio playlists. The Top 40 Radio Monitor became the official airplay component of the Hot 100 with the issue dated November 30, 1991, when the methodology of the Hot 100 was changed to utilize both BDS (airplay) and Soundscan (sales) technology. BDS measures actual airplay by monitoring radio stations continuously with computers that "listen for the unique 'audio fingerprint' of each song and register a detection every time a song is played." One of the first noticeable effects of the change in methodology was that there tended to be less turnover of the top songs. Before the switch, no song had spent at least ten weeks at number one on the Hot 100 Airplay chart, but from December 1990 until the end of the decade, 17 songs had a minimum ten-week run at the top of the chart. While the BDS technology may have had some impact as to why this was happening, the cause has also been attributed to the trends of the radio industry at the time with stations playing the same songs over longer periods of time.

In the mid-1990s, a new trend began to emerge: singles without being released commercially in an attempt to boost album sales. While not a new concept, it started becoming commonplace. With the June 17, 1995, issue, "I'll Be There for You", became the first single to top the Hot 100 Airplay chart without appearing on the Hot 100. (It would later peak at No. 17 on the Hot 100 when released as a B-side to the Rembrandts follow-up single, "This House Is Not a Home", combined with its continued but fading dominance on the radio.) More songs followed with tracks such as "Don't Speak", "Men in Black", "Fly", "Torn", and "Iris", each becoming the most played song on American pop radio, despite being ineligible to chart on the Hot 100 itself due to a lack of a commercially available single. While this practice did not end, in the Billboard issue dated December 5, 1998, policy was revised to allow "airplay-only" songs to chart on the Hot 100.

Number-one airplay hits

See also
1990s in music
List of Hot 100 number-one singles of the 1990s (U.S.)

Notes and references

Additional sources
Whitburn, Joel. The Billboard Book of Top 40 Hits. (2004) 
Billboard Biz

United States Hot 100 Airplay
Billboard charts
Lists of number-one songs in the United States
1990s in American music